Rinkenæs may refer to:

, a town in Denmark.
, a Danish cargo ship in service 1946–1947